Ciro Guerra (born 6 February 1981) is a Colombian film director and screenwriter. He is best known for his 2015 film Embrace of the Serpent, the film was nominated for Best Foreign Language Film at the 88th Academy Awards.

Career
He made his first film Wandering Shadows in 2004 at the age of 23. The film was selected as Colombian submission for Best Foreign Language Film at the 78th Academy Awards, however it was not nominated. His next film The Wind Journeys competed in the Un Certain Regard section at the 2009 Cannes Film Festival and was selected as Colombian submission for Best Foreign Language Film at the 82nd Academy Awards; it also was not selected.

His 2015 film Embrace of the Serpent was screened in the Directors' Fortnight section at the 2015 Cannes Film Festival, where it won the C.I.C.A.E. Award. It won the Best Film award in the International Film Festivals of Odessa and Lima, where it also received a special prize by the Critics Jury. The film was also among the nominees for Best Foreign Language Film at the 88th Academy Awards, being the first Colombian film ever to be nominated.

On 22 November 2017, Netflix ordered the limited series Green Frontier to production. Green Frontier is based on an original idea from Diego Ramírez Schrempp and Jenny Ceballos of Dynamo Producciones. Guerra is credited as an executive producer of the series, alongside, Diego Ramírez Schrempp, Andrés Calderón, Jorge Dorado and Cristian Conti. The series was directed by Guerra, Laura Mora Ortega and Jacques Toulemonde Vidal and written by Mauricio Leiva-Cock, Antón Goenechea, Camila Brugrés, Gibrán Portela, Javier Peñalosa, María Camila Arias, Natalia Santa and Nicolás Serrano. The miniseries premiered on Netflix on 16 August 2019. 

In 2018, Guerra released his fourth feature film, Birds of Passage. Filmed in La Guajira Desert, Colombia, Guerra states that it is "like a gangster film, but something completely different from any gangster film that you have ever seen".

Guerra has also directed an adaptation of J. M. Coetzee's novel Waiting for the Barbarians, starring Mark Rylance, Johnny Depp, Robert Pattinson, Gana Bayarsaikhan, and Greta Scacchi. The film premiered at the Venice Film Festival on 6 September 2019, and was released on 7 August 2020, by Samuel Goldwyn Films.

He was the jury president of the International Critics' Week section of the 2019 Cannes Film Festival.

Personal life
Guerra was married to his longtime producer Cristina Gallego. The couple divorced during the filming of Birds of Passage which they co-directed.

In 2020, Latin American feminist periodical Volcánicas published an in-depth investigation with eight women in the film industry accusing Guerra of sexual harassment. Guerra denied the accusations and vowed to pursue legal action against those who had made them. In May 2021, a court in Bogota, Colombia, ruled in favour of Guerra, and ordered the magazine rectify its report, as their claims lacked detail and evidence.

Filmography

Awards and nominations

Accolades
 2021 - Jury member at 52nd International Film Festival of India, Goa.

References

External links

Ciro Guerra at Proimágenes

1981 births
Living people
Colombian film directors
Colombian screenwriters
Male screenwriters
Silver Condor Award for Best Ibero-American Film winners
Alfred P. Sloan Prize winners